Väärinmaja is a village in the municipality of Ruovesi in the Pirkanmaa region, Finland. The village of is known of the 1918 Finnish Civil War Battle of Väärinmaja. In 2008–2010, Väärinmaja hosted a stage of the World Rally Championship event Rally Finland.

References 

Ruovesi
Villages in Finland